Events from the year 1940 in Taiwan, Empire of Japan.

Incumbents

Central government of Japan
 Prime Minister: Nobuyuki Abe, Mitsumasa Yonai, Fumimaro Konoe

Taiwan
 Governor-General – Seizō Kobayashi, Kiyoshi Hasegawa

Births
 20 March – Lin Fong-cheng, Vice Chairperson of Kuomintang (2007-2014)
 24 June – Su Yu-chang, martial artist, scholar and practitioner of traditional Chinese medicine
 10 July – Chen Chao-min, Minister of National Defense (2008-2009)
 29 November – Tang Yao-ming, Minister of National Defense (2002-2004)

References

 
Years of the 20th century in Taiwan